Silvio Milazzo (Caltagirone, September 4, 1903 – December 24, 1982) was an Italian Christian Democrat politician and the President of the Regional Government of Sicily from 1958 to 1960.

Sicilian deputy
Milazzo was a landowner from Caltagirone and sat in the Sicilian regional parliament since 1947 for the Christian Democrat Party (DC) in the political current of Mario Scelba. He was the Regional Minister for Public Works and for Agriculture in the regional governments of Franco Restivo (1949-1955), Giuseppe Alessi (1955-1956) and Giuseppe La Loggia (1956-1958). He was a reliable party loyalist up to the time former Italian Premier Amintore Fanfani began to bring in bright young men from Rome into Sicily's Christian Democratic organization. Outraged by this infringement on Sicilian autonomy and threat to Sicilian patronage, Milazzo became the gullible protagonist of Sicilian autonomy.

After the regional elections of 1955, Milazzo, supported by the left and dissident Christian democrats, surprisingly had won the vote for head of the regional government against the outgoing president Restivo. However, the DC did not give its consent and after 37 minutes Milazzo was forced to renounce the appointment. He became vice-president under Giuseppe Alessi. It would be a prelude for the years to come.

Regional president
In October 1958, Milazzo formed an atypical coalition government that was supported by Communists, Monarchists, Neo-Fascists and dissident Christian Democrats, breaking the power monopoly of the DC, that had ruled Sicily since 1947. Despite the expulsion of Milazzo and his followers from the party, he continued to head the Sicilian regional government. The expelled members formed a new party, the Social Christian Sicilian Union (Unione Siciliana Cristiano Sociale, USCS), in December 1958. He competed in the regional elections in June 1959 under the slogan "Sicily for the Sicilians. Down with the mainland."

The Christian Democrat party establishment appealed to the Vatican to counter Milazzo. Armed with a papal decree banning Catholics to vote for any candidate allied with Communists, Sicily's Cardinal Ernesto Ruffini sent Catholic Action groups from door to door to campaign against Milazzo. In the US, the Hearst press implored its Italian-American readers to send anti-Milazzo letters and telegrams to Sicily; advising the use of night-rate cables. The New York Journal American pleaded: "Even $2.75 is a small price for preserving democracy."

"They have called me a Trojan horse," Milazzo said. "But I am not that. I am a pure-blooded Sicilian horse, a noble animal. I am an anti-Communist leading only a rebellion against the injustices of Rome." After the indecisive regional elections in June 1959 in which the UCSC gained 10 per cent of the votes, Milazzo again succeeded in forming a majority coalition with the aid of Christian Democratic defectors.

Downfall
Milazzo was under constant pressure from the Vatican and the Christian Democratic national government led by Antonio Segni, and spent most of his time trying to defend his two-vote majority in Sicily's regional Assembly. In February 1960, Milazzo resigned, after a regional deputy revealed that he was approached to change allegiance for a substantial amount of money by one of Milazzo's top aides, the Communist Ludovico Corrao.

The nation's anti-Communist press and politicians seized the occasion to remove the Italian Communists from their one real foothold in Italy. "An unheard-of attempt at corruption," Milan's Corriere della Sera headlined. The Communist maintained a bewildered silence. Rome's pro-Communist newspaper Paese Sera claimed that Milazzo was the victim of a Mafia plot.

Mafia backing?
On the contrary, rumours about Mafia backing of Milazzo's government were confirmed in the 1980s by several Mafia turncoats (pentiti), such as Tommaso Buscetta and Antonio Calderone. Both the Mafia clan in Catania and the Cosa Nostra-backed entrepreneur Costanzo campaigned for Milazzo. The Salvo cousins supported the Milazzo government as well as the old Mafia families of Greco and Bontade.

The Operation Milazzo, as it was called, was something of a clientelist “coup”, according to scholar René Seindal. The Christian Democrats lost control of the region's resources and the various parts of Milazzo's coalition strengthened their negotiating position towards the Christian Democrats. The Salvos, for instance, gained control over the private concession for collecting taxes in Sicily with extremely favourable conditions. To consolidate the privilege, the Salvos unscrupulously withdrew their support for Milazzo to ally themselves with the mainstream Christian Democrats which tried to regain control of the region to maintain their cliental power base.

From then until the mid-1980s the Salvos were among the most powerful businessmen in the economic, political and social life of Sicily – until they were prosecuted by Palermo's Antimafia pool that included Giovanni Falcone and Paolo Borsellino. They controlled the Christian Democratic party branch in the Province of Trapani that guaranteed them great influence over the regional decision making of the DC. After initially supporting Milazzo, the Mafia was not opposed to the fall of his government as well – and Mafia boss Francesco Paolo Bontade and later his son Stefano Bontade sustained a close relationship with the Salvo cousins, which allowed them access to regional politics.

History of 'Milazzoism' 
In Sicily on October 30, 1958 the regional deputy Silvio Milazzo of DC was elected president of the Sicilian Region with the votes, in the Sicilian Regional Assembly, of the parties of the right and the left, against the official candidate of his party, Giuseppe La Loggia, indicated by the national leaders of the DC, then led by Amintore Fanfani. Silvio Milazzo, exponent of the most extensive autonomism, was at odds with the strongly centralizing direction given to the organization of DC by Fanfani, then also President of the, while the position of the President of the Republic Gronchi

The first milazzo junta 
The first junta milazzo was attended together by representatives of the PCI and the MSI, allies "in the name of the superior interests of the Sicilians", said the regional secretary of the PCI Emanuele Macaluso (who had been given the green light by Palmiro Togliatti) and the group leader at the ARS of the MSI Dino Grammatico, with the consent of Giorgio Almirante.

Silvio Milazzo was immediately expelled from DC, then created with a group of regional deputies a new political party, the Sicilian Christian Social Union (USCS). Dino Grammatico in his memoirs defined that first phase of milazzismo as a "Sicilian Revolt",

The Church's opposition 
The Catholic Church was strongly criticized with the operation and in April 1959 the Holy Office renewed the excommunication to the Communists extending it to those, such as the Milazzo movement, who allied with them and a few months later, on the eve of the regional elections, the Sicilian episcopate expressly invited not to vote for the USCS.

Milazzo second junta and crisis 
Milazzo, after the June 1959 regional elections, where his movement won 10 ARS deputies, formed a second junta on August 12, 1959, in which the MSI did not enter, which returned to opposition, along with DC. This second junta had a varied support around the USCS, the left, the monarchists, the top of Sicindustria, then led by Domenico La Cavera,who had already broken with Confindustria, up to exponents close to the Mafia. The ideologues at that stage were Ludovico Corrao and the national deputy Francesco Pignatone.

This brief second term at the head of the Milazzo Region, came into crisis due to a scandal, with an attempt at corruption organized by two deputies, one of the PCI (Vincenzo Marraro) and one of the USCS (Ludovico Corrao), denounced by a DC deputy, Carmelo Santalco, who were promised 100 million to vote in favor of the junta, a conversation that he recorded. The crisis ended in February 1960, when a member of his movement, Benedetto Majorana della Nicchiara, was persuaded by D.C. majors to accept the office of president of the region, in a majority of Christian Democrats, liberals and monarchists, with the external support of the MSI.

Milazzo also resigned as a regional deputy in 1962. The USCS disbanded after the 1963 regional election, where it did not win a seat.

References

 Paoli, Letizia (2003). Mafia Brotherhoods: Organized Crime, Italian Style, New York: Oxford University Press 
 Seindal, René (1998). Mafia: Money and Politics in Sicily, 1950-1997, Copenhagen: Museum Tusculanum Press

External links
  Il governo Milazzo
  Profilo Deputato Milazzo Silvio, Assemblea Regionale Siciliana

1903 births
1982 deaths
Presidents of Sicily
People from Caltagirone
Christian Democracy (Italy) politicians
20th-century Italian politicians
Politicians from the Province of Catania